This is a partial list of unnumbered minor planets for principal provisional designations assigned during 1–31 December 2001. , a total of 311 bodies remain unnumbered for this period. Objects for this year are listed on the following pages: A–E · Fi · Fii · G–O · P–R · S · T · U · V–W and X–Y. Also see previous and next year.

X 

|- id="2001 XP" bgcolor=#FFC2E0
| 6 || 2001 XP || APO || 20.8 || data-sort-value="0.25" | 250 m || single || 30 days || 17 Dec 2001 || 19 || align=left | Disc.: LINEAR || 
|- id="2001 XQ" bgcolor=#FFC2E0
| 0 || 2001 XQ || APO || 19.2 || data-sort-value="0.51" | 510 m || multiple || 2001–2015 || 22 Dec 2015 || 161 || align=left | Disc.: LINEARPotentially hazardous objectAMO at MPCAlt.: 2008 VV4 || 
|- id="2001 XG1" bgcolor=#FFC2E0
| 0 ||  || APO || 23.2 || data-sort-value="0.081" | 81 m || multiple || 2001–2018 || 09 Dec 2018 || 112 || align=left | Disc.: LINEAR || 
|- id="2001 XM1" bgcolor=#FA8072
| – ||  || MCA || 18.9 || data-sort-value="0.49" | 490 m || single || 31 days || 16 Dec 2001 || 51 || align=left | Disc.: LINEAR || 
|- id="2001 XB3" bgcolor=#fefefe
| 1 ||  || MBA-I || 18.37 || data-sort-value="0.86" | 630 m || multiple || 2001-2023 || 29 Jan 2023 || 59 || align=left | Disc.: LINEARAlt.: 2022 UF116 || 
|- id="2001 XS4" bgcolor=#FA8072
| 3 ||  || MCA || 18.3 || data-sort-value="0.65" | 650 m || multiple || 2001–2014 || 11 Dec 2014 || 46 || align=left | Disc.: LINEAR || 
|- id="2001 XU4" bgcolor=#FFC2E0
| 9 ||  || APO || 23.8 || data-sort-value="0.062" | 62 m || single || 5 days || 14 Dec 2001 || 30 || align=left | Disc.: LINEAR || 
|- id="2001 XX4" bgcolor=#FFC2E0
| 4 ||  || APO || 22.1 || data-sort-value="0.14" | 140 m || multiple || 2001–2003 || 03 Jan 2003 || 102 || align=left | Disc.: LINEAR || 
|- id="2001 XW10" bgcolor=#FFC2E0
| 3 ||  || APO || 19.4 || data-sort-value="0.47" | 470 m || multiple || 2001–2004 || 31 Dec 2004 || 39 || align=left | Disc.: LINEAR || 
|- id="2001 XH16" bgcolor=#FFC2E0
| 8 ||  || APO || 24.8 || data-sort-value="0.039" | 39 m || single || 11 days || 20 Dec 2001 || 12 || align=left | Disc.: Mauna Kea Obs. || 
|- id="2001 XL16" bgcolor=#FFE699
| 6 ||  || Asteroid || 20.6 || data-sort-value="0.42" | 420 m || single || 32 days || 22 Dec 2001 || 15 || align=left | Disc.: SpacewatchMCA at MPC || 
|- id="2001 XD31" bgcolor=#FA8072
| 0 ||  || MCA || 16.5 || 2.8 km || multiple || 2001–2020 || 29 Jan 2020 || 127 || align=left | Disc.: LINEARAlt.: 2010 XO14 || 
|- id="2001 XP31" bgcolor=#FFC2E0
| 4 ||  || APO || 22.2 || data-sort-value="0.13" | 130 m || multiple || 2001–2018 || 04 Feb 2018 || 38 || align=left | Disc.: LINEARAlt.: 2017 WB15 || 
|- id="2001 XQ31" bgcolor=#FFC2E0
| 4 ||  || AMO || 19.2 || data-sort-value="0.51" | 510 m || single || 111 days || 09 Mar 2002 || 72 || align=left | Disc.: LINEAR || 
|- id="2001 XW31" bgcolor=#FA8072
| 0 ||  || MCA || 17.08 || 1.1 km || multiple || 2001–2022 || 19 Jan 2022 || 137 || align=left | Disc.: LINEARAlt.: 2004 WB1 || 
|- id="2001 XZ31" bgcolor=#FA8072
| 0 ||  || MCA || 17.8 || data-sort-value="0.82" | 820 m || multiple || 2001–2019 || 27 Aug 2019 || 58 || align=left | Disc.: LINEAR || 
|- id="2001 XM34" bgcolor=#fefefe
| 0 ||  || MBA-I || 17.0 || 1.2 km || multiple || 2001–2020 || 06 Dec 2020 || 248 || align=left | Disc.: LINEARAlt.: 2016 NK34 || 
|- id="2001 XP42" bgcolor=#FA8072
| 1 ||  || MCA || 17.7 || data-sort-value="0.86" | 860 m || multiple || 2001–2020 || 19 Feb 2020 || 77 || align=left | Disc.: LINEAR || 
|- id="2001 XH49" bgcolor=#fefefe
| 0 ||  || MBA-I || 17.3 || 1.0 km || multiple || 2001–2020 || 16 Feb 2020 || 104 || align=left | Disc.: LINEARAlt.: 2008 VJ28 || 
|- id="2001 XO49" bgcolor=#FA8072
| 0 ||  || HUN || 19.09 || data-sort-value="0.45" | 450 m || multiple || 2001–2021 || 16 Dec 2021 || 175 || align=left | Disc.: LINEAR || 
|- id="2001 XB69" bgcolor=#FA8072
| 0 ||  || HUN || 18.62 || data-sort-value="0.56" | 560 m || multiple || 2001–2021 || 09 May 2021 || 79 || align=left | Disc.: LINEAR || 
|- id="2001 XR69" bgcolor=#FA8072
| 2 ||  || MCA || 17.5 || data-sort-value="0.94" | 940 m || multiple || 2001–2017 || 24 Jun 2017 || 45 || align=left | Disc.: LINEARAlt.: 2005 SZ133 || 
|- id="2001 XC76" bgcolor=#E9E9E9
| 0 ||  || MBA-M || 17.30 || 1.5 km || multiple || 2001–2021 || 12 May 2021 || 137 || align=left | Disc.: LINEAR || 
|- id="2001 XW76" bgcolor=#FA8072
| 1 ||  || MCA || 18.0 || 1.1 km || multiple || 2001–2019 || 08 Feb 2019 || 123 || align=left | Disc.: LINEAR || 
|- id="2001 XW77" bgcolor=#E9E9E9
| 0 ||  || MBA-M || 17.3 || 1.0 km || multiple || 2001–2019 || 30 Jan 2019 || 53 || align=left | Disc.: LINEAR || 
|- id="2001 XZ78" bgcolor=#d6d6d6
| 0 ||  || MBA-O || 15.9 || 3.7 km || multiple || 2001–2020 || 22 Jun 2020 || 101 || align=left | Disc.: LINEARAlt.: 2012 XP132 || 
|- id="2001 XG79" bgcolor=#fefefe
| 1 ||  || MBA-I || 17.8 || data-sort-value="0.82" | 820 m || multiple || 2001–2019 || 11 Oct 2019 || 95 || align=left | Disc.: LINEAR || 
|- id="2001 XK79" bgcolor=#d6d6d6
| 1 ||  || MBA-O || 17.3 || 1.9 km || multiple || 2001–2018 || 14 Jan 2018 || 122 || align=left | Disc.: LINEARAlt.: 2006 QC128 || 
|- id="2001 XN88" bgcolor=#FA8072
| – ||  || MCA || 18.6 || data-sort-value="0.57" | 570 m || single || 30 days || 12 Jan 2002 || 29 || align=left | Disc.: LINEAR || 
|- id="2001 XO88" bgcolor=#FFC2E0
| 7 ||  || APO || 22.0 || data-sort-value="0.14" | 140 m || single || 26 days || 09 Jan 2002 || 28 || align=left | Disc.: LINEAR || 
|- id="2001 XF91" bgcolor=#E9E9E9
| 2 ||  || MBA-M || 17.4 || 1.4 km || multiple || 2001–2019 || 04 Jan 2019 || 67 || align=left | Disc.: LINEARAlt.: 2015 AQ11 || 
|- id="2001 XE92" bgcolor=#d6d6d6
| 0 ||  || MBA-O || 16.63 || 2.6 km || multiple || 2001–2021 || 30 Jun 2021 || 157 || align=left | Disc.: LINEARAlt.: 2017 OC4 || 
|- id="2001 XP102" bgcolor=#fefefe
| 1 ||  || HUN || 18.1 || data-sort-value="0.71" | 710 m || multiple || 2001–2021 || 03 May 2021 || 65 || align=left | Disc.: LINEAR || 
|- id="2001 XU102" bgcolor=#E9E9E9
| 1 ||  || MBA-M || 17.4 || 1.4 km || multiple || 2001–2020 || 22 Jun 2020 || 80 || align=left | Disc.: LINEARAlt.: 2018 XS5 || 
|- id="2001 XQ103" bgcolor=#fefefe
| 0 ||  || HUN || 18.5 || data-sort-value="0.59" | 590 m || multiple || 2001–2020 || 12 Sep 2020 || 52 || align=left | Disc.: LINEARAdded on 13 September 2020 || 
|- id="2001 XX103" bgcolor=#FFC2E0
| 7 ||  || APO || 23.6 || data-sort-value="0.068" | 68 m || single || 5 days || 20 Dec 2001 || 30 || align=left | Disc.: LINEAR || 
|- id="2001 XY103" bgcolor=#E9E9E9
| 1 ||  || MBA-M || 17.38 || 1.4 km || multiple || 2001-2022 || 20 Dec 2022 || 33 || align=left | Disc.: LINEAR || 
|- id="2001 XE104" bgcolor=#FFE699
| 1 ||  || Asteroid || 18.6 || 1.1 km || multiple || 2001–2019 || 28 Dec 2019 || 73 || align=left | Disc.: LINEARMCA at MPC || 
|- id="2001 XG105" bgcolor=#FFC2E0
| 4 ||  || APO || 21.4 || data-sort-value="0.19" | 190 m || single || 63 days || 16 Feb 2002 || 59 || align=left | Disc.: LINEARAMO at MPC || 
|- id="2001 XK105" bgcolor=#FFC2E0
| 3 ||  || AMO || 23.8 || data-sort-value="0.062" | 62 m || single || 73 days || 16 Feb 2002 || 27 || align=left | Disc.: LINEAR || 
|- id="2001 XB114" bgcolor=#d6d6d6
| 1 ||  || MBA-O || 17.33 || 1.9 km || multiple || 2001–2021 || 05 Jul 2021 || 42 || align=left | Disc.: LINEAR || 
|- id="2001 XF120" bgcolor=#E9E9E9
| 0 ||  || MBA-M || 17.6 || 1.7 km || multiple || 2001–2020 || 11 May 2020 || 213 || align=left | Disc.: LINEAR || 
|- id="2001 XZ121" bgcolor=#fefefe
| 0 ||  || MBA-I || 18.62 || data-sort-value="0.56" | 560 m || multiple || 2001–2021 || 03 May 2021 || 61 || align=left | Disc.: LINEARAlt.: 2012 TU19 || 
|- id="2001 XB122" bgcolor=#fefefe
| 0 ||  || MBA-I || 17.3 || 1.0 km || multiple || 2001–2021 || 01 Oct 2021 || 222 || align=left | Disc.: LINEARAlt.: 2001 WS49 || 
|- id="2001 XB124" bgcolor=#FA8072
| 3 ||  || MCA || 18.5 || data-sort-value="0.59" | 590 m || multiple || 1986–2016 || 18 Dec 2016 || 54 || align=left | Disc.: Palomar Obs.Alt.: 1986 VE8 || 
|- id="2001 XB127" bgcolor=#fefefe
| 0 ||  || MBA-I || 17.1 || 1.1 km || multiple || 1997–2021 || 05 Jan 2021 || 240 || align=left | Disc.: LINEAR || 
|- id="2001 XO127" bgcolor=#d6d6d6
| 0 ||  || MBA-O || 16.7 || 2.5 km || multiple || 2001–2019 || 01 May 2019 || 71 || align=left | Disc.: LINEAR || 
|- id="2001 XW129" bgcolor=#d6d6d6
| 0 ||  || MBA-O || 17.1 || 2.1 km || multiple || 2001–2019 || 02 May 2019 || 58 || align=left | Disc.: LINEAR || 
|- id="2001 XA131" bgcolor=#fefefe
| 0 ||  || MBA-I || 17.52 || data-sort-value="0.93" | 930 m || multiple || 2001–2021 || 18 Apr 2021 || 191 || align=left | Disc.: LINEARAlt.: 2006 BO215 || 
|- id="2001 XU132" bgcolor=#d6d6d6
| 0 ||  || HIL || 15.6 || 4.2 km || multiple || 2001–2020 || 16 May 2020 || 104 || align=left | Disc.: LINEARAlt.: 2010 EH169 || 
|- id="2001 XA135" bgcolor=#E9E9E9
| 0 ||  || MBA-M || 16.77 || 2.5 km || multiple || 2001–2021 || 14 Apr 2021 || 89 || align=left | Disc.: LINEARAlt.: 2010 XM49 || 
|- id="2001 XB135" bgcolor=#d6d6d6
| 0 ||  || MBA-O || 16.42 || 2.9 km || multiple || 2001–2021 || 30 Oct 2021 || 89 || align=left | Disc.: LINEAR || 
|- id="2001 XM136" bgcolor=#E9E9E9
| 1 ||  || MBA-M || 18.71 || data-sort-value="0.54" | 540 m || multiple || 2001–2021 || 31 Jul 2021 || 48 || align=left | Disc.: LINEARAlt.: 2005 VC52 || 
|- id="2001 XO138" bgcolor=#E9E9E9
| – ||  || MBA-M || 18.2 || data-sort-value="0.68" | 680 m || single || 5 days || 17 Dec 2001 || 11 || align=left | Disc.: LINEAR || 
|- id="2001 XF144" bgcolor=#E9E9E9
| E ||  || MBA-M || 17.2 || 1.5 km || single || 6 days || 20 Dec 2001 || 13 || align=left | Disc.: LINEAR || 
|- id="2001 XO144" bgcolor=#d6d6d6
| 1 ||  || MBA-O || 16.7 || 2.5 km || multiple || 2001–2019 || 04 Jan 2019 || 68 || align=left | Disc.: LINEAR || 
|- id="2001 XW150" bgcolor=#FFE699
| – ||  || Asteroid || 17.4 || 1.8 km || single || 8 days || 22 Dec 2001 || 12 || align=left | Disc.: LINEARMBA at MPC || 
|- id="2001 XG152" bgcolor=#fefefe
| 1 ||  || MBA-I || 17.4 || data-sort-value="0.98" | 980 m || multiple || 2001–2020 || 08 Dec 2020 || 100 || align=left | Disc.: LINEARAlt.: 2010 GR191 || 
|- id="2001 XM155" bgcolor=#E9E9E9
| 0 ||  || MBA-M || 17.2 || 1.5 km || multiple || 2001–2020 || 23 Jun 2020 || 91 || align=left | Disc.: LINEAR || 
|- id="2001 XK160" bgcolor=#fefefe
| 0 ||  || MBA-I || 18.6 || data-sort-value="0.57" | 570 m || multiple || 2001–2020 || 24 Mar 2020 || 47 || align=left | Disc.: LINEARAdded on 22 July 2020 || 
|- id="2001 XJ161" bgcolor=#d6d6d6
| – ||  || MBA-O || 17.0 || 2.2 km || single || 31 days || 14 Jan 2002 || 14 || align=left | Disc.: LINEAR || 
|- id="2001 XR168" bgcolor=#fefefe
| 0 ||  || MBA-I || 18.2 || data-sort-value="0.68" | 680 m || multiple || 1999–2020 || 16 Mar 2020 || 67 || align=left | Disc.: LINEARAlt.: 2013 EN96 || 
|- id="2001 XW181" bgcolor=#fefefe
| 0 ||  || MBA-I || 17.2 || 1.1 km || multiple || 2001–2021 || 04 Jan 2021 || 108 || align=left | Disc.: LINEARAlt.: 2012 TB223 || 
|- id="2001 XO200" bgcolor=#E9E9E9
| 0 ||  || MBA-M || 17.2 || 1.5 km || multiple || 2001–2020 || 01 Feb 2020 || 89 || align=left | Disc.: LINEARAlt.: 2014 SV325 || 
|- id="2001 XW200" bgcolor=#fefefe
| 3 ||  || MBA-I || 18.0 || data-sort-value="0.75" | 750 m || multiple || 2001–2016 || 05 Mar 2016 || 99 || align=left | Disc.: LINEARAlt.: 2008 XR3 || 
|- id="2001 XS201" bgcolor=#E9E9E9
| 2 ||  || MBA-M || 17.8 || 1.2 km || multiple || 2001–2020 || 04 Jan 2020 || 27 || align=left | Disc.: LPL/Spacewatch II || 
|- id="2001 XF202" bgcolor=#d6d6d6
| 0 ||  || MBA-O || 17.0 || 2.3 km || multiple || 2001–2023 || 09 Jan 2023 || 263 || align=left | Disc.: LINEAR || 
|- id="2001 XW219" bgcolor=#FA8072
| 0 ||  || MCA || 18.65 || data-sort-value="0.55" | 550 m || multiple || 2001–2022 || 07 Jan 2022 || 196 || align=left | Disc.: LINEARAlt.: 2011 UQ254 || 
|- id="2001 XL220" bgcolor=#d6d6d6
| 2 ||  || MBA-O || 16.1 || 3.4 km || multiple || 2001–2020 || 22 Jan 2020 || 73 || align=left | Disc.: LINEAR || 
|- id="2001 XF221" bgcolor=#E9E9E9
| – ||  || MBA-M || 19.1 || data-sort-value="0.64" | 640 m || single || 4 days || 19 Dec 2001 || 12 || align=left | Disc.: LINEAR || 
|- id="2001 XT224" bgcolor=#E9E9E9
| 0 ||  || MBA-M || 17.90 || 1.5 km || multiple || 2001–2021 || 13 May 2021 || 84 || align=left | Disc.: LINEARAlt.: 2010 VU91 || 
|- id="2001 XC225" bgcolor=#fefefe
| 1 ||  || HUN || 18.3 || data-sort-value="0.65" | 650 m || multiple || 2001–2020 || 19 Jan 2020 || 77 || align=left | Disc.: LINEAR || 
|- id="2001 XM229" bgcolor=#d6d6d6
| 0 ||  || MBA-O || 16.3 || 3.1 km || multiple || 2001–2021 || 08 Jun 2021 || 58 || align=left | Disc.: LINEARAlt.: 2012 TT318 || 
|- id="2001 XR229" bgcolor=#E9E9E9
| 1 ||  || MBA-M || 17.3 || 1.9 km || multiple || 2001–2020 || 14 Feb 2020 || 297 || align=left | Disc.: LINEARAlt.: 2010 VZ27 || 
|- id="2001 XU230" bgcolor=#fefefe
| 0 ||  || MBA-I || 17.9 || data-sort-value="0.78" | 780 m || multiple || 2001–2019 || 23 Oct 2019 || 67 || align=left | Disc.: LINEAR || 
|- id="2001 XG232" bgcolor=#fefefe
| 1 ||  || HUN || 18.1 || data-sort-value="0.71" | 710 m || multiple || 2001–2019 || 27 Oct 2019 || 60 || align=left | Disc.: LINEAR || 
|- id="2001 XQ232" bgcolor=#d6d6d6
| 3 ||  || MBA-O || 16.4 || 2.9 km || multiple || 1996–2001 || 19 Dec 2001 || 22 || align=left | Disc.: LINEAR || 
|- id="2001 XU237" bgcolor=#d6d6d6
| 0 ||  || MBA-O || 16.4 || 2.9 km || multiple || 2001–2019 || 28 Jan 2019 || 40 || align=left | Disc.: LINEAR || 
|- id="2001 XY241" bgcolor=#fefefe
| 0 ||  || MBA-I || 17.4 || data-sort-value="0.98" | 980 m || multiple || 2001–2021 || 13 Jan 2021 || 194 || align=left | Disc.: LINEAR || 
|- id="2001 XJ242" bgcolor=#E9E9E9
| 0 ||  || MBA-M || 18.21 || data-sort-value="0.68" | 680 m || multiple || 2001–2021 || 27 Nov 2021 || 151 || align=left | Disc.: LINEARAlt.: 2009 WY140 || 
|- id="2001 XW242" bgcolor=#d6d6d6
| 3 ||  || MBA-O || 17.0 || 2.2 km || multiple || 2001–2018 || 24 Jan 2018 || 49 || align=left | Disc.: LINEAR || 
|- id="2001 XZ245" bgcolor=#fefefe
| 3 ||  || MBA-I || 17.7 || data-sort-value="0.86" | 860 m || multiple || 2001–2016 || 06 Dec 2016 || 41 || align=left | Disc.: LINEAR || 
|- id="2001 XU246" bgcolor=#E9E9E9
| 0 ||  || MBA-M || 16.62 || 1.4 km || multiple || 2001–2021 || 01 Nov 2021 || 118 || align=left | Disc.: LINEARAlt.: 2010 BE96 || 
|- id="2001 XC247" bgcolor=#E9E9E9
| 0 ||  || MBA-M || 17.5 || 1.3 km || multiple || 2001–2020 || 16 May 2020 || 118 || align=left | Disc.: LINEARAlt.: 2015 AS10 || 
|- id="2001 XZ248" bgcolor=#E9E9E9
| 0 ||  || MBA-M || 17.4 || 1.8 km || multiple || 2000–2021 || 16 Jan 2021 || 98 || align=left | Disc.: LPL/Spacewatch IIAlt.: 2016 AH41 || 
|- id="2001 XY251" bgcolor=#fefefe
| 0 ||  || MBA-I || 17.7 || data-sort-value="0.86" | 860 m || multiple || 2001–2021 || 16 Jan 2021 || 89 || align=left | Disc.: LINEARAdded on 17 January 2021Alt.: 2005 YV246 || 
|- id="2001 XG253" bgcolor=#fefefe
| 2 ||  || MBA-I || 17.5 || data-sort-value="0.94" | 940 m || multiple || 2001–2021 || 13 Jun 2021 || 37 || align=left | Disc.: LINEARAdded on 9 March 2021Alt.: 2018 WE6 || 
|- id="2001 XJ253" bgcolor=#d6d6d6
| 0 ||  || MBA-O || 16.34 || 3.0 km || multiple || 2001–2021 || 19 May 2021 || 190 || align=left | Disc.: Spacewatch || 
|- id="2001 XU254" bgcolor=#C2E0FF
| 4 ||  || TNO || 6.68 || 237 km || multiple || 2001–2020 || 09 Dec 2020 || 30 || align=left | Disc.: Mauna Kea Obs.LoUTNOs, cubewano (hot) || 
|- id="2001 XV254" bgcolor=#C2E0FF
| E ||  || TNO || 7.0 || 137 km || single || 59 days || 06 Feb 2002 || 7 || align=left | Disc.: Mauna Kea Obs.LoUTNOs, cubewano? || 
|- id="2001 XW254" bgcolor=#C2E0FF
| E ||  || TNO || 7.7 || 99 km || single || 29 days || 08 Jan 2002 || 4 || align=left | Disc.: Mauna Kea Obs.LoUTNOs, cubewano? || 
|- id="2001 XX254" bgcolor=#C2E0FF
| 4 ||  || TNO || 7.32 || 114 km || multiple || 2001–2021 || 11 Jan 2021 || 20 || align=left | Disc.: Mauna Kea Obs.LoUTNOs, cubewano (cold) || 
|- id="2001 XB255" bgcolor=#C2E0FF
| E ||  || TNO || 6.8 || 150 km || single || 36 days || 14 Jan 2002 || 5 || align=left | Disc.: Mauna Kea Obs.LoUTNOs, cubewano? || 
|- id="2001 XC255" bgcolor=#C2E0FF
| E ||  || TNO || 7.4 || 114 km || single || 56 days || 03 Feb 2002 || 6 || align=left | Disc.: Mauna Kea Obs.LoUTNOs, cubewano? || 
|- id="2001 XE255" bgcolor=#C2E0FF
| E ||  || TNO || 7.9 || 90 km || single || 36 days || 14 Jan 2002 || 4 || align=left | Disc.: Mauna Kea Obs.LoUTNOs, cubewano? || 
|- id="2001 XF255" bgcolor=#C2E0FF
| E ||  || TNO || 7.7 || 99 km || single || 36 days || 14 Jan 2002 || 4 || align=left | Disc.: Mauna Kea Obs.LoUTNOs, cubewano? || 
|- id="2001 XG255" bgcolor=#C2E0FF
| E ||  || TNO || 8.3 || 75 km || single || 36 days || 14 Jan 2002 || 5 || align=left | Disc.: Mauna Kea Obs.LoUTNOs, cubewano? || 
|- id="2001 XJ255" bgcolor=#C2E0FF
| E ||  || TNO || 8.3 || 75 km || single || 34 days || 14 Jan 2002 || 5 || align=left | Disc.: Mauna Kea Obs.LoUTNOs, cubewano? || 
|- id="2001 XQ255" bgcolor=#fefefe
| 0 ||  || MBA-I || 18.7 || data-sort-value="0.54" | 540 m || multiple || 2001–2020 || 16 Mar 2020 || 53 || align=left | Disc.: SpacewatchAlt.: 2016 AX89 || 
|- id="2001 XZ255" bgcolor=#C7FF8F
| 3 ||  || CEN || 11.1 || 34 km || multiple || 2001–2003 || 03 Mar 2003 || 13 || align=left | Disc.: Mauna Kea Obs., BR-mag: 2.04 || 
|- id="2001 XG258" bgcolor=#FA8072
| 0 ||  || MCA || 19.14 || data-sort-value="0.62" | 620 m || multiple || 2001–2019 || 30 Jan 2019 || 70 || align=left | Disc.: LONEOS || 
|- id="2001 XT260" bgcolor=#E9E9E9
| 0 ||  || MBA-M || 17.0 || 2.2 km || multiple || 2001–2021 || 17 Jan 2021 || 110 || align=left | Disc.: LINEARAlt.: 2015 XE207 || 
|- id="2001 XP261" bgcolor=#d6d6d6
| 0 ||  || MBA-O || 15.70 || 6.9 km || multiple || 2001–2021 || 18 Jun 2021 || 185 || align=left | Disc.: LINEARAlt.: 2010 HU53 || 
|- id="2001 XL262" bgcolor=#fefefe
| 1 ||  || MBA-I || 18.2 || data-sort-value="0.68" | 680 m || multiple || 2001–2020 || 23 Jan 2020 || 63 || align=left | Disc.: NEAT || 
|- id="2001 XS263" bgcolor=#d6d6d6
| 2 ||  || MBA-O || 17.9 || 1.5 km || multiple || 2001–2019 || 02 Mar 2019 || 55 || align=left | Disc.: NEAT || 
|- id="2001 XP264" bgcolor=#fefefe
| 0 ||  || HUN || 18.3 || data-sort-value="0.65" | 650 m || multiple || 2001–2020 || 26 Jan 2020 || 74 || align=left | Disc.: SpacewatchAlt.: 2013 HY18 || 
|- id="2001 XV264" bgcolor=#E9E9E9
| 0 ||  || MBA-M || 17.25 || 2.0 km || multiple || 2001–2021 || 09 May 2021 || 84 || align=left | Disc.: LINEARAlt.: 2014 TC38 || 
|- id="2001 XF265" bgcolor=#E9E9E9
| 0 ||  || MBA-M || 18.11 || data-sort-value="0.71" | 710 m || multiple || 2001–2021 || 05 Oct 2021 || 57 || align=left | Disc.: LINEAR || 
|- id="2001 XG265" bgcolor=#fefefe
| 0 ||  || HUN || 18.93 || data-sort-value="0.49" | 490 m || multiple || 2001–2021 || 31 Aug 2021 || 77 || align=left | Disc.: LPL/Spacewatch IIAlt.: 2011 UJ91, 2015 BE294 || 
|- id="2001 XR266" bgcolor=#E9E9E9
| 0 ||  || MBA-M || 17.59 || 1.7 km || multiple || 2001–2021 || 13 May 2021 || 47 || align=left | Disc.: AstrovirtelAlt.: 2005 WK136, 2014 TT78 || 
|- id="2001 XQ267" bgcolor=#d6d6d6
| 0 ||  || MBA-O || 16.4 || 2.9 km || multiple || 2001–2021 || 13 Jun 2021 || 121 || align=left | Disc.: SDSSAlt.: 2012 XK4 || 
|- id="2001 XT267" bgcolor=#E9E9E9
| 0 ||  || MBA-M || 17.1 || 2.1 km || multiple || 2001–2020 || 02 Feb 2020 || 97 || align=left | Disc.: SDSS || 
|- id="2001 XB268" bgcolor=#fefefe
| 0 ||  || MBA-I || 18.2 || data-sort-value="0.68" | 680 m || multiple || 2001–2020 || 10 Sep 2020 || 115 || align=left | Disc.: SDSS || 
|- id="2001 XC268" bgcolor=#d6d6d6
| 0 ||  || MBA-O || 16.56 || 2.7 km || multiple || 2001–2021 || 03 Oct 2021 || 107 || align=left | Disc.: SDSS || 
|- id="2001 XE268" bgcolor=#E9E9E9
| 0 ||  || MBA-M || 16.9 || 1.2 km || multiple || 2001–2020 || 23 Oct 2020 || 103 || align=left | Disc.: SDSS || 
|- id="2001 XF268" bgcolor=#fefefe
| 0 ||  || MBA-I || 18.45 || data-sort-value="0.61" | 610 m || multiple || 2001–2021 || 23 Oct 2021 || 104 || align=left | Disc.: Spacewatch || 
|- id="2001 XH268" bgcolor=#E9E9E9
| 0 ||  || MBA-M || 16.7 || 1.9 km || multiple || 2001–2020 || 29 Jan 2020 || 76 || align=left | Disc.: LPL/Spacewatch II || 
|- id="2001 XJ268" bgcolor=#d6d6d6
| 0 ||  || MBA-O || 17.0 || 2.2 km || multiple || 2001–2019 || 04 Feb 2019 || 61 || align=left | Disc.: SDSS || 
|- id="2001 XL268" bgcolor=#d6d6d6
| 0 ||  || MBA-O || 16.5 || 2.8 km || multiple || 2001–2020 || 21 Mar 2020 || 68 || align=left | Disc.: SDSS || 
|- id="2001 XM268" bgcolor=#fefefe
| 0 ||  || MBA-I || 19.2 || data-sort-value="0.43" | 430 m || multiple || 2001–2018 || 29 Nov 2018 || 61 || align=left | Disc.: SDSS || 
|- id="2001 XN268" bgcolor=#fefefe
| 0 ||  || MBA-I || 17.5 || data-sort-value="0.94" | 940 m || multiple || 2001–2021 || 09 Jan 2021 || 89 || align=left | Disc.: Spacewatch || 
|- id="2001 XO268" bgcolor=#E9E9E9
| 0 ||  || MBA-M || 17.11 || 2.1 km || multiple || 2001–2021 || 07 May 2021 || 77 || align=left | Disc.: SDSS || 
|- id="2001 XQ268" bgcolor=#d6d6d6
| 0 ||  || MBA-O || 16.31 || 3.0 km || multiple || 2001–2021 || 19 May 2021 || 200 || align=left | Disc.: SDSS || 
|- id="2001 XR268" bgcolor=#E9E9E9
| 0 ||  || MBA-M || 17.3 || 1.0 km || multiple || 2001–2020 || 11 May 2020 || 40 || align=left | Disc.: SDSS || 
|- id="2001 XT268" bgcolor=#d6d6d6
| 0 ||  || MBA-O || 16.1 || 3.4 km || multiple || 2001–2020 || 13 Apr 2020 || 57 || align=left | Disc.: SDSSAlt.: 2010 HU67 || 
|- id="2001 XU268" bgcolor=#fefefe
| 0 ||  || HUN || 18.2 || data-sort-value="0.68" | 680 m || multiple || 2001–2019 || 25 Nov 2019 || 106 || align=left | Disc.: SDSSAlt.: 2018 AJ17 || 
|- id="2001 XV268" bgcolor=#d6d6d6
| 0 ||  || MBA-O || 16.85 || 2.4 km || multiple || 1995–2021 || 09 Nov 2021 || 126 || align=left | Disc.: Spacewatch || 
|- id="2001 XX268" bgcolor=#fefefe
| 0 ||  || MBA-I || 18.32 || data-sort-value="0.64" | 640 m || multiple || 2001–2021 || 12 May 2021 || 115 || align=left | Disc.: SDSS || 
|- id="2001 XY268" bgcolor=#d6d6d6
| 0 ||  || MBA-O || 16.1 || 3.4 km || multiple || 2001–2019 || 17 Dec 2019 || 79 || align=left | Disc.: SDSS || 
|- id="2001 XA269" bgcolor=#fefefe
| 0 ||  || MBA-I || 18.2 || data-sort-value="0.68" | 680 m || multiple || 2001–2019 || 27 Oct 2019 || 70 || align=left | Disc.: Spacewatch || 
|- id="2001 XB269" bgcolor=#E9E9E9
| 0 ||  || MBA-M || 17.1 || 2.1 km || multiple || 2001–2021 || 17 Jan 2021 || 88 || align=left | Disc.: SDSS || 
|- id="2001 XC269" bgcolor=#fefefe
| 0 ||  || MBA-I || 18.6 || data-sort-value="0.57" | 570 m || multiple || 2001–2020 || 19 Jan 2020 || 75 || align=left | Disc.: SDSS || 
|- id="2001 XE269" bgcolor=#E9E9E9
| 0 ||  || MBA-M || 18.22 || data-sort-value="0.67" | 670 m || multiple || 2001–2021 || 02 Dec 2021 || 75 || align=left | Disc.: SDSS || 
|- id="2001 XF269" bgcolor=#fefefe
| 0 ||  || MBA-I || 18.45 || data-sort-value="0.61" | 610 m || multiple || 2001–2021 || 03 Apr 2021 || 69 || align=left | Disc.: Spacewatch || 
|- id="2001 XG269" bgcolor=#E9E9E9
| 0 ||  || MBA-M || 17.61 || 1.3 km || multiple || 2001–2021 || 11 Oct 2021 || 56 || align=left | Disc.: SDSS || 
|- id="2001 XJ269" bgcolor=#d6d6d6
| 0 ||  || MBA-O || 16.5 || 2.8 km || multiple || 2001–2020 || 02 Feb 2020 || 62 || align=left | Disc.: Spacewatch || 
|- id="2001 XL269" bgcolor=#E9E9E9
| 0 ||  || MBA-M || 17.5 || 1.3 km || multiple || 2001–2020 || 23 Apr 2020 || 58 || align=left | Disc.: NEAT || 
|- id="2001 XM269" bgcolor=#d6d6d6
| 3 ||  || MBA-O || 17.1 || 2.1 km || multiple || 2001–2019 || 08 Jan 2019 || 20 || align=left | Disc.: LPL/Spacewatch II || 
|- id="2001 XO269" bgcolor=#d6d6d6
| 0 ||  || MBA-O || 16.1 || 3.4 km || multiple || 2001–2019 || 09 Feb 2019 || 46 || align=left | Disc.: SDSSAlt.: 2010 FG112 || 
|- id="2001 XQ269" bgcolor=#E9E9E9
| 0 ||  || MBA-M || 17.5 || 1.3 km || multiple || 2001–2020 || 21 Apr 2020 || 71 || align=left | Disc.: Spacewatch || 
|- id="2001 XR269" bgcolor=#d6d6d6
| 0 ||  || MBA-O || 15.76 || 3.9 km || multiple || 2001–2022 || 12 Jan 2022 || 117 || align=left | Disc.: SDSSAlt.: 2010 HQ85 || 
|- id="2001 XT269" bgcolor=#E9E9E9
| 2 ||  || MBA-M || 18.1 || 1.3 km || multiple || 2001–2019 || 21 Oct 2019 || 33 || align=left | Disc.: Spacewatch || 
|- id="2001 XU269" bgcolor=#E9E9E9
| 0 ||  || MBA-M || 17.46 || data-sort-value="0.96" | 960 m || multiple || 2001–2021 || 31 Oct 2021 || 93 || align=left | Disc.: SpacewatchAdded on 21 August 2021Alt.: 2010 CP205 || 
|}
back to top

Y 

|- id="2001 YH" bgcolor=#fefefe
| 1 || 2001 YH || HUN || 17.7 || data-sort-value="0.86" | 860 m || multiple || 2001–2020 || 14 Nov 2020 || 112 || align=left | Disc.: LINEAR || 
|- id="2001 YL" bgcolor=#FA8072
| 5 || 2001 YL || HUN || 19.3 || data-sort-value="0.41" | 410 m || multiple || 2001–2019 || 01 Dec 2019 || 34 || align=left | Disc.: LINEARAlt.: 2019 WF5 || 
|- id="2001 YM" bgcolor=#FA8072
| – || 2001 YM || MCA || 19.1 || data-sort-value="0.64" | 640 m || single || 5 days || 19 Dec 2001 || 14 || align=left | Disc.: LINEAR || 
|- id="2001 YQ" bgcolor=#E9E9E9
| 1 || 2001 YQ || MBA-M || 17.3 || 1.5 km || multiple || 2001–2018 || 14 Dec 2018 || 42 || align=left | Disc.: LINEARAlt.: 2014 WC6 || 
|- id="2001 YW" bgcolor=#FA8072
| 1 || 2001 YW || HUN || 18.1 || data-sort-value="0.71" | 710 m || multiple || 2001–2019 || 24 Jun 2019 || 112 || align=left | Disc.: LINEAR || 
|- id="2001 YZ" bgcolor=#FA8072
| 0 || 2001 YZ || MCA || 18.74 || data-sort-value="0.53" | 530 m || multiple || 2001–2020 || 18 Jul 2020 || 95 || align=left | Disc.: LINEAR || 
|- id="2001 YA1" bgcolor=#FFC2E0
| 5 ||  || AMO || 20.8 || data-sort-value="0.25" | 250 m || single || 62 days || 17 Feb 2002 || 22 || align=left | Disc.: LINEAR || 
|- id="2001 YB1" bgcolor=#FFC2E0
| 2 ||  || AMO || 21.7 || data-sort-value="0.16" | 160 m || multiple || 2001–2016 || 21 Dec 2016 || 36 || align=left | Disc.: LINEAR || 
|- id="2001 YC1" bgcolor=#FFC2E0
| – ||  || APO || 24.1 || data-sort-value="0.054" | 54 m || single || 2 days || 19 Dec 2001 || 13 || align=left | Disc.: LINEAR || 
|- id="2001 YD1" bgcolor=#FFC2E0
| 8 ||  || APO || 24.4 || data-sort-value="0.047" | 47 m || single || 7 days || 24 Dec 2001 || 32 || align=left | Disc.: LINEAR || 
|- id="2001 YE1" bgcolor=#FFC2E0
| 5 ||  || APO || 20.8 || data-sort-value="0.25" | 250 m || single || 58 days || 13 Feb 2002 || 120 || align=left | Disc.: LINEAR || 
|- id="2001 YR1" bgcolor=#fefefe
| 1 ||  || HUN || 18.6 || data-sort-value="0.57" | 570 m || multiple || 2001–2021 || 06 Jun 2021 || 44 || align=left | Disc.: LINEAR || 
|- id="2001 YZ1" bgcolor=#fefefe
| 0 ||  || HUN || 17.8 || data-sort-value="0.82" | 820 m || multiple || 2001–2020 || 09 Dec 2020 || 102 || align=left | Disc.: LINEARAdded on 13 September 2020 || 
|- id="2001 YM2" bgcolor=#FFC2E0
| 0 ||  || AMO || 19.5 || data-sort-value="0.45" | 450 m || multiple || 2001–2013 || 17 Jan 2013 || 192 || align=left | Disc.: LINEAR || 
|- id="2001 YN2" bgcolor=#FFC2E0
| 7 ||  || APO || 25.4 || data-sort-value="0.030" | 30 m || single || 21 days || 08 Jan 2002 || 35 || align=left | Disc.: LINEAR || 
|- id="2001 YO2" bgcolor=#FFC2E0
| 7 ||  || APO || 21.0 || data-sort-value="0.22" | 220 m || single || 24 days || 11 Jan 2002 || 25 || align=left | Disc.: LINEAR || 
|- id="2001 YP3" bgcolor=#FFC2E0
| 0 ||  || APO || 22.0 || data-sort-value="0.14" | 140 m || multiple || 2001–2005 || 10 Dec 2005 || 127 || align=left | Disc.: LINEARPotentially hazardous object || 
|- id="2001 YQ3" bgcolor=#FA8072
| 1 ||  || MCA || 17.7 || 1.6 km || multiple || 2001–2017 || 24 May 2017 || 88 || align=left | Disc.: LONEOSAlt.: 2017 HH3 || 
|- id="2001 YR3" bgcolor=#FFC2E0
| – ||  || AMO || 23.3 || data-sort-value="0.078" | 78 m || single || 4 days || 23 Dec 2001 || 19 || align=left | Disc.: LINEAR || 
|- id="2001 YS3" bgcolor=#FA8072
| 1 ||  || MCA || 19.0 || data-sort-value="0.47" | 470 m || multiple || 2001–2018 || 04 Aug 2018 || 105 || align=left | Disc.: NEAT || 
|- id="2001 YT3" bgcolor=#FFC2E0
| 1 ||  || AMO || 20.8 || data-sort-value="0.25" | 250 m || multiple || 1991–2013 || 05 Apr 2013 || 115 || align=left | Disc.: Spacewatch || 
|- id="2001 YU3" bgcolor=#FFC2E0
| 0 ||  || AMO || 19.90 || data-sort-value="0.37" | 370 m || multiple || 2001–2021 || 09 Jun 2021 || 466 || align=left | Disc.: LINEAR || 
|- id="2001 YV3" bgcolor=#FFC2E0
| 0 ||  || APO || 20.59 || data-sort-value="0.27" | 270 m || multiple || 2001–2021 || 18 Jan 2021 || 163 || align=left | Disc.: AMOSPotentially hazardous object || 
|- id="2001 YW3" bgcolor=#fefefe
| 0 ||  || HUN || 18.14 || data-sort-value="0.70" | 700 m || multiple || 2001–2021 || 04 Jul 2021 || 151 || align=left | Disc.: LINEAR || 
|- id="2001 YM4" bgcolor=#FFC2E0
| 1 ||  || AMO || 19.9 || data-sort-value="0.37" | 370 m || multiple || 2001–2020 || 23 Jan 2020 || 123 || align=left | Disc.: LINEAR || 
|- id="2001 YB5" bgcolor=#FFC2E0
| 5 ||  || APO || 20.9 || data-sort-value="0.23" | 230 m || single || 11 days || 06 Jan 2002 || 396 || align=left | Disc.: NEATPotentially hazardous object || 
|- id="2001 YJ8" bgcolor=#d6d6d6
| 0 ||  || MBA-O || 16.80 || 2.4 km || multiple || 2001–2021 || 16 Jun 2021 || 47 || align=left | Disc.: LINEAR || 
|- id="2001 YP9" bgcolor=#E9E9E9
| 0 ||  || MBA-M || 17.2 || 1.5 km || multiple || 2001–2020 || 19 Apr 2020 || 107 || align=left | Disc.: LINEARAlt.: 2014 WU486 || 
|- id="2001 YD10" bgcolor=#E9E9E9
| 0 ||  || MBA-M || 17.2 || 2.0 km || multiple || 2001–2021 || 12 Jun 2021 || 161 || align=left | Disc.: LINEARAlt.: 2010 YO4 || 
|- id="2001 YP10" bgcolor=#d6d6d6
| 0 ||  || MBA-O || 16.4 || 2.9 km || multiple || 2001–2018 || 22 Jan 2018 || 57 || align=left | Disc.: LINEAR || 
|- id="2001 YX11" bgcolor=#FFC2E0
| 0 ||  || AMO || 20.0 || data-sort-value="0.36" | 360 m || multiple || 2001–2008 || 05 Dec 2008 || 98 || align=left | Disc.: LONEOS || 
|- id="2001 YZ11" bgcolor=#FA8072
| 2 ||  || MCA || 17.4 || data-sort-value="0.98" | 980 m || multiple || 2001–2017 || 24 Apr 2017 || 90 || align=left | Disc.: LINEAR || 
|- id="2001 YG12" bgcolor=#fefefe
| 0 ||  || HUN || 18.42 || data-sort-value="0.62" | 620 m || multiple || 2001–2021 || 01 Jul 2021 || 101 || align=left | Disc.: LINEARAlt.: 2014 UL117, 2016 NO32 || 
|- id="2001 YN12" bgcolor=#d6d6d6
| 1 ||  || MBA-O || 17.1 || 2.1 km || multiple || 2001–2019 || 01 Feb 2019 || 42 || align=left | Disc.: LINEAR || 
|- id="2001 YH13" bgcolor=#fefefe
| 0 ||  || MBA-I || 18.99 || data-sort-value="0.47" | 470 m || multiple || 2001–2022 || 01 Jan 2022 || 51 || align=left | Disc.: LINEAR || 
|- id="2001 YN13" bgcolor=#E9E9E9
| 0 ||  || MBA-M || 17.38 || 1.9 km || multiple || 2001–2021 || 07 Jun 2021 || 88 || align=left | Disc.: LINEARAlt.: 2014 WE316 || 
|- id="2001 YP13" bgcolor=#E9E9E9
| 0 ||  || MBA-M || 17.14 || 1.6 km || multiple || 2001–2021 || 30 May 2021 || 96 || align=left | Disc.: LINEARAlt.: 2014 YP29, 2017 KR20 || 
|- id="2001 YY14" bgcolor=#E9E9E9
| 0 ||  || MBA-M || 17.1 || 1.6 km || multiple || 1999–2020 || 21 Apr 2020 || 97 || align=left | Disc.: LINEARAlt.: 2011 BR102 || 
|- id="2001 YL15" bgcolor=#E9E9E9
| 0 ||  || MBA-M || 17.11 || 1.6 km || multiple || 2001–2021 || 03 May 2021 || 108 || align=left | Disc.: LINEARAlt.: 2014 VW3 || 
|- id="2001 YZ23" bgcolor=#E9E9E9
| 0 ||  || MBA-M || 17.0 || 2.2 km || multiple || 2001–2021 || 18 Jan 2021 || 206 || align=left | Disc.: LINEARAlt.: 2010 OG136, 2012 DY21 || 
|- id="2001 YB24" bgcolor=#d6d6d6
| 0 ||  || MBA-O || 16.5 || 2.8 km || multiple || 2001–2018 || 13 Jan 2018 || 58 || align=left | Disc.: LINEARAlt.: 2013 AJ71 || 
|- id="2001 YC24" bgcolor=#d6d6d6
| 0 ||  || MBA-O || 16.4 || 2.9 km || multiple || 2001–2020 || 11 May 2020 || 72 || align=left | Disc.: LINEAR || 
|- id="2001 YL25" bgcolor=#d6d6d6
| 0 ||  || MBA-O || 16.1 || 3.4 km || multiple || 1996–2020 || 23 Jun 2020 || 140 || align=left | Disc.: LINEAR || 
|- id="2001 YQ25" bgcolor=#d6d6d6
| 0 ||  || MBA-O || 16.9 || 2.3 km || multiple || 2001–2019 || 28 Jan 2019 || 50 || align=left | Disc.: LINEARAlt.: 2012 XR10 || 
|- id="2001 YY26" bgcolor=#E9E9E9
| 0 ||  || MBA-M || 17.6 || 1.3 km || multiple || 2001–2020 || 24 Jun 2020 || 67 || align=left | Disc.: LINEARAlt.: 2018 VB56 || 
|- id="2001 YP29" bgcolor=#E9E9E9
| 0 ||  || MBA-M || 17.2 || 1.5 km || multiple || 2001–2020 || 11 Mar 2020 || 106 || align=left | Disc.: LINEARAlt.: 2014 UQ91 || 
|- id="2001 YH30" bgcolor=#d6d6d6
| 0 ||  || MBA-O || 16.9 || 2.3 km || multiple || 2001–2019 || 09 Jan 2019 || 40 || align=left | Disc.: LINEAR || 
|- id="2001 YT30" bgcolor=#fefefe
| 1 ||  || MBA-I || 18.2 || data-sort-value="0.68" | 680 m || multiple || 2001–2020 || 25 Jan 2020 || 48 || align=left | Disc.: LINEARAdded on 24 August 2020Alt.: 2015 VW67 || 
|- id="2001 YF31" bgcolor=#fefefe
| 0 ||  || MBA-I || 18.6 || data-sort-value="0.57" | 570 m || multiple || 2001–2021 || 17 Jan 2021 || 88 || align=left | Disc.: LINEAR || 
|- id="2001 YH31" bgcolor=#d6d6d6
| 5 ||  || HIL || 15.55 || 6.6 km || multiple || 2001-2010 || 28 Feb 2010 || 22 || align=left | Disc.: LINEAR Alt.: 2010 DK68 || 
|- id="2001 YP31" bgcolor=#E9E9E9
| 0 ||  || MBA-M || 17.3 || 1.5 km || multiple || 2001–2015 || 21 Jan 2015 || 27 || align=left | Disc.: LINEARAlt.: 2015 BO282 || 
|- id="2001 YX31" bgcolor=#fefefe
| 0 ||  || MBA-I || 18.7 || data-sort-value="0.54" | 540 m || multiple || 2001–2020 || 25 May 2020 || 83 || align=left | Disc.: LINEARAlt.: 2006 FJ29 || 
|- id="2001 YM43" bgcolor=#E9E9E9
| 0 ||  || MBA-M || 17.31 || 1.5 km || multiple || 1999–2021 || 08 Sep 2021 || 117 || align=left | Disc.: LINEAR || 
|- id="2001 YX44" bgcolor=#d6d6d6
| 1 ||  || MBA-O || 15.8 || 3.9 km || multiple || 2001–2020 || 20 Feb 2020 || 97 || align=left | Disc.: LINEARAlt.: 2018 VK27 || 
|- id="2001 YP45" bgcolor=#fefefe
| 0 ||  || MBA-I || 17.72 || data-sort-value="0.85" | 850 m || multiple || 2001–2021 || 03 Oct 2021 || 106 || align=left | Disc.: LINEAR || 
|- id="2001 YN48" bgcolor=#E9E9E9
| 0 ||  || MBA-M || 17.50 || data-sort-value="0.94" | 940 m || multiple || 2001–2021 || 13 Oct 2021 || 36 || align=left | Disc.: LINEARAdded on 24 December 2021 || 
|- id="2001 YU48" bgcolor=#fefefe
| 0 ||  || MBA-I || 17.95 || data-sort-value="0.76" | 760 m || multiple || 2001–2021 || 15 May 2021 || 82 || align=left | Disc.: LINEAR || 
|- id="2001 YN55" bgcolor=#d6d6d6
| 0 ||  || MBA-O || 16.5 || 2.8 km || multiple || 2001–2020 || 26 Jun 2020 || 61 || align=left | Disc.: LINEARAdded on 22 July 2020Alt.: 2020 JS12 || 
|- id="2001 YQ55" bgcolor=#d6d6d6
| 0 ||  || MBA-O || 16.8 || 2.4 km || multiple || 2001–2021 || 11 Jan 2021 || 82 || align=left | Disc.: LINEAR || 
|- id="2001 YY55" bgcolor=#fefefe
| 0 ||  || MBA-I || 18.10 || data-sort-value="0.71" | 710 m || multiple || 2001–2021 || 08 May 2021 || 147 || align=left | Disc.: LINEARAlt.: 2008 SN3, 2015 PP26 || 
|- id="2001 YD57" bgcolor=#d6d6d6
| 0 ||  || MBA-O || 15.7 || 4.0 km || multiple || 2001–2021 || 08 Jun 2021 || 115 || align=left | Disc.: LINEARAlt.: 2012 VA112 || 
|- id="2001 YW59" bgcolor=#fefefe
| 0 ||  || MBA-I || 17.78 || data-sort-value="0.83" | 830 m || multiple || 1995–2021 || 14 Apr 2021 || 167 || align=left | Disc.: LINEARAlt.: 2008 SZ232 || 
|- id="2001 YK61" bgcolor=#C7FF8F
| 3 ||  || CEN || 13.7 || 11 km || single || 61 days || 21 Jan 2002 || 31 || align=left | Disc.: LINEAR || 
|- id="2001 YV71" bgcolor=#E9E9E9
| 4 ||  || MBA-M || 17.8 || 1.2 km || multiple || 2001–2018 || 31 Dec 2018 || 38 || align=left | Disc.: LINEAR || 
|- id="2001 YG76" bgcolor=#fefefe
| 0 ||  || MBA-I || 17.3 || 1.0 km || multiple || 2001–2021 || 12 Jan 2021 || 126 || align=left | Disc.: LINEAR || 
|- id="2001 YS77" bgcolor=#E9E9E9
| 0 ||  || MBA-M || 17.57 || 1.7 km || multiple || 2001–2021 || 09 Apr 2021 || 90 || align=left | Disc.: LINEARAlt.: 2016 AV3 || 
|- id="2001 YT88" bgcolor=#E9E9E9
| 0 ||  || MBA-M || 17.4 || 1.8 km || multiple || 2001–2020 || 03 Feb 2020 || 103 || align=left | Disc.: LINEARAlt.: 2010 XC4 || 
|- id="2001 YF89" bgcolor=#d6d6d6
| 0 ||  || MBA-O || 16.18 || 3.2 km || multiple || 2001–2019 || 05 Apr 2019 || 121 || align=left | Disc.: LINEAR || 
|- id="2001 YL92" bgcolor=#d6d6d6
| 3 ||  || MBA-O || 16.8 || 2.4 km || multiple || 2001–2018 || 13 Jan 2018 || 46 || align=left | Disc.: LPL/Spacewatch II || 
|- id="2001 YW92" bgcolor=#d6d6d6
| 0 ||  || MBA-O || 16.4 || 2.9 km || multiple || 2001–2020 || 21 Apr 2020 || 87 || align=left | Disc.: Kitt Peak Obs. || 
|- id="2001 YA93" bgcolor=#d6d6d6
| 0 ||  || MBA-O || 17.46 || 1.8 km || multiple || 2001–2021 || 06 Nov 2021 || 47 || align=left | Disc.: Kitt Peak Obs.Added on 5 November 2021 || 
|- id="2001 YC93" bgcolor=#d6d6d6
| 4 ||  || MBA-O || 17.5 || 1.8 km || multiple || 2001–2019 || 08 Feb 2019 || 17 || align=left | Disc.: Kitt Peak Obs. || 
|- id="2001 YE93" bgcolor=#d6d6d6
| 0 ||  || MBA-O || 16.13 || 3.3 km || multiple || 2001–2021 || 26 Nov 2021 || 173 || align=left | Disc.: Kitt Peak Obs.Alt.: 2010 KN41 || 
|- id="2001 YF93" bgcolor=#E9E9E9
| 3 ||  || MBA-M || 19.1 || data-sort-value="0.45" | 450 m || multiple || 2001–2021 || 26 Nov 2021 || 25 || align=left | Disc.: Kitt Peak Obs.Added on 29 January 2022 || 
|- id="2001 YS97" bgcolor=#fefefe
| 0 ||  || MBA-I || 17.6 || data-sort-value="0.90" | 900 m || multiple || 2001–2019 || 28 Dec 2019 || 114 || align=left | Disc.: LINEARAlt.: 2008 UN363 || 
|- id="2001 YB100" bgcolor=#fefefe
| 0 ||  || HUN || 18.2 || data-sort-value="0.68" | 680 m || multiple || 2001–2020 || 07 Nov 2020 || 111 || align=left | Disc.: LINEAR || 
|- id="2001 YP100" bgcolor=#d6d6d6
| 0 ||  || MBA-O || 16.26 || 3.1 km || multiple || 2001–2021 || 08 Jul 2021 || 41 || align=left | Disc.: LINEAR || 
|- id="2001 YM125" bgcolor=#fefefe
| 1 ||  || MBA-I || 17.9 || data-sort-value="0.78" | 780 m || multiple || 2001–2021 || 07 Jan 2021 || 59 || align=left | Disc.: LINEAR || 
|- id="2001 YY132" bgcolor=#d6d6d6
| 2 ||  || MBA-O || 16.2 || 3.2 km || multiple || 2001–2019 || 09 Feb 2019 || 34 || align=left | Disc.: LINEARAlt.: 2018 XS9 || 
|- id="2001 YN133" bgcolor=#E9E9E9
| 1 ||  || MBA-M || 18.30 || data-sort-value="0.65" | 650 m || multiple || 2001–2021 || 23 Nov 2021 || 70 || align=left | Disc.: Spacewatch || 
|- id="2001 YS134" bgcolor=#d6d6d6
| 0 ||  || MBA-O || 16.3 || 3.1 km || multiple || 2001–2019 || 12 Jan 2019 || 48 || align=left | Disc.: LINEAR || 
|- id="2001 YB141" bgcolor=#E9E9E9
| 0 ||  || MBA-M || 18.16 || data-sort-value="0.98" | 980 m || multiple || 2001–2018 || 17 Nov 2018 || 51 || align=left | Disc.: LINEAR || 
|- id="2001 YV141" bgcolor=#E9E9E9
| 0 ||  || MBA-M || 17.09 || 2.1 km || multiple || 2001–2021 || 08 Apr 2021 || 105 || align=left | Disc.: LINEARAlt.: 2010 XQ15, 2014 ST263 || 
|- id="2001 YP142" bgcolor=#d6d6d6
| 1 ||  || MBA-O || 17.65 || 1.6 km || multiple || 2001–2021 || 14 Aug 2021 || 43 || align=left | Disc.: LINEAR || 
|- id="2001 YJ144" bgcolor=#d6d6d6
| 0 ||  || MBA-O || 17.13 || 2.1 km || multiple || 2001–2021 || 09 Aug 2021 || 51 || align=left | Disc.: LINEAR || 
|- id="2001 YA148" bgcolor=#E9E9E9
| 0 ||  || MBA-M || 16.8 || 1.8 km || multiple || 2001–2020 || 20 Apr 2020 || 83 || align=left | Disc.: LINEARAlt.: 2011 CZ42 || 
|- id="2001 YG149" bgcolor=#fefefe
| 0 ||  || MBA-I || 17.8 || data-sort-value="0.82" | 820 m || multiple || 2001–2020 || 16 Mar 2020 || 81 || align=left | Disc.: NEATAlt.: 2006 EO29 || 
|- id="2001 YR150" bgcolor=#d6d6d6
| 0 ||  || MBA-O || 16.40 || 2.9 km || multiple || 1999–2021 || 30 May 2021 || 97 || align=left | Disc.: LINEARAlt.: 2010 OF51 || 
|- id="2001 YE151" bgcolor=#fefefe
| 0 ||  || MBA-I || 18.7 || data-sort-value="0.54" | 540 m || multiple || 2001–2020 || 07 Oct 2020 || 51 || align=left | Disc.: Spacewatch || 
|- id="2001 YF158" bgcolor=#d6d6d6
| 0 ||  || MBA-O || 17.8 || 1.5 km || multiple || 2001–2020 || 12 Dec 2020 || 101 || align=left | Disc.: SDSSAlt.: 2007 CZ36 || 
|- id="2001 YL158" bgcolor=#E9E9E9
| 0 ||  || MBA-M || 17.00 || 1.2 km || multiple || 2001–2021 || 02 Dec 2021 || 150 || align=left | Disc.: SDSSAlt.: 2011 FC146 || 
|- id="2001 YP158" bgcolor=#d6d6d6
| 0 ||  || MBA-O || 17.0 || 2.2 km || multiple || 2001–2019 || 02 Apr 2019 || 47 || align=left | Disc.: SDSS || 
|- id="2001 YS158" bgcolor=#E9E9E9
| 0 ||  || MBA-M || 17.98 || data-sort-value="0.75" | 750 m || multiple || 2001–2021 || 06 Nov 2021 || 61 || align=left | Disc.: SDSS || 
|- id="2001 YZ158" bgcolor=#d6d6d6
| 0 ||  || MBA-O || 17.40 || 1.8 km || multiple || 2001–2021 || 10 Aug 2021 || 28 || align=left | Disc.: SDSSAdded on 24 December 2021 || 
|- id="2001 YD159" bgcolor=#d6d6d6
| 0 ||  || MBA-O || 16.4 || 2.9 km || multiple || 2001–2021 || 05 Aug 2021 || 68 || align=left | Disc.: SDSSAdded on 22 July 2020Alt.: 2011 UU291 || 
|- id="2001 YK159" bgcolor=#d6d6d6
| 0 ||  || MBA-O || 16.47 || 2.8 km || multiple || 2001–2021 || 02 Dec 2021 || 126 || align=left | Disc.: SDSSAdded on 21 August 2021 || 
|- id="2001 YG160" bgcolor=#d6d6d6
| 0 ||  || MBA-O || 16.52 || 2.8 km || multiple || 1994–2020 || 26 Apr 2020 || 106 || align=left | Disc.: SDSS || 
|- id="2001 YN160" bgcolor=#d6d6d6
| 0 ||  || MBA-O || 16.6 || 2.7 km || multiple || 2001–2020 || 22 Jun 2020 || 35 || align=left | Disc.: SDSSAdded on 13 September 2020 || 
|- id="2001 YE162" bgcolor=#fefefe
| 0 ||  || MBA-I || 18.4 || data-sort-value="0.62" | 620 m || multiple || 2001–2020 || 21 Oct 2020 || 137 || align=left | Disc.: SpacewatchAlt.: 2005 YN280 || 
|- id="2001 YM162" bgcolor=#fefefe
| 0 ||  || MBA-I || 18.0 || data-sort-value="0.75" | 750 m || multiple || 2001–2021 || 13 Feb 2021 || 76 || align=left | Disc.: LPL/Spacewatch IIAdded on 11 May 2021Alt.: 2015 PU137 || 
|- id="2001 YO162" bgcolor=#E9E9E9
| 0 ||  || MBA-M || 17.47 || 1.7 km || multiple || 2002–2021 || 04 Dec 2021 || 176 || align=left | Disc.: NEATAlt.: 2010 EB54 || 
|- id="2001 YP162" bgcolor=#d6d6d6
| 0 ||  || MBA-O || 15.9 || 3.7 km || multiple || 2001–2020 || 21 Apr 2020 || 162 || align=left | Disc.: NEATAlt.: 2010 FV116 || 
|- id="2001 YR162" bgcolor=#E9E9E9
| 0 ||  || MBA-M || 16.69 || 1.4 km || multiple || 2001–2021 || 06 Dec 2021 || 121 || align=left | Disc.: SDSS || 
|- id="2001 YT162" bgcolor=#d6d6d6
| 0 ||  || MBA-O || 16.56 || 2.7 km || multiple || 2001–2021 || 07 Nov 2021 || 107 || align=left | Disc.: Spacewatch || 
|- id="2001 YW162" bgcolor=#fefefe
| 0 ||  || MBA-I || 18.4 || data-sort-value="0.62" | 620 m || multiple || 1996–2020 || 02 Dec 2020 || 120 || align=left | Disc.: Spacewatch || 
|- id="2001 YY162" bgcolor=#d6d6d6
| 0 ||  || MBA-O || 16.2 || 3.2 km || multiple || 2001–2020 || 20 May 2020 || 86 || align=left | Disc.: SDSS || 
|- id="2001 YZ162" bgcolor=#E9E9E9
| 0 ||  || MBA-M || 17.22 || 1.5 km || multiple || 2001–2021 || 05 Jul 2021 || 121 || align=left | Disc.: SDSS || 
|- id="2001 YA163" bgcolor=#fefefe
| 0 ||  || MBA-I || 17.8 || data-sort-value="0.82" | 820 m || multiple || 2001–2020 || 27 Feb 2020 || 83 || align=left | Disc.: SDSS || 
|- id="2001 YC163" bgcolor=#fefefe
| 0 ||  || MBA-I || 18.0 || data-sort-value="0.75" | 750 m || multiple || 2001–2021 || 27 Sep 2021 || 136 || align=left | Disc.: Spacewatch || 
|- id="2001 YD163" bgcolor=#d6d6d6
| 0 ||  || MBA-O || 16.76 || 2.5 km || multiple || 2001–2021 || 30 Sep 2021 || 85 || align=left | Disc.: SDSS || 
|- id="2001 YF163" bgcolor=#d6d6d6
| 0 ||  || MBA-O || 16.52 || 2.8 km || multiple || 2001–2021 || 05 Jul 2021 || 90 || align=left | Disc.: NEAT || 
|- id="2001 YG163" bgcolor=#d6d6d6
| 0 ||  || MBA-O || 16.78 || 2.5 km || multiple || 2001–2021 || 07 Jul 2021 || 84 || align=left | Disc.: SDSS || 
|- id="2001 YH163" bgcolor=#fefefe
| 0 ||  || MBA-I || 17.16 || 1.1 km || multiple || 2001–2022 || 27 Jan 2022 || 179 || align=left | Disc.: NEAT || 
|- id="2001 YJ163" bgcolor=#d6d6d6
| 0 ||  || MBA-O || 16.7 || 2.5 km || multiple || 2001–2020 || 25 May 2020 || 60 || align=left | Disc.: SDSS || 
|- id="2001 YK163" bgcolor=#E9E9E9
| 0 ||  || MBA-M || 17.27 || 1.5 km || multiple || 2001–2021 || 03 Oct 2021 || 70 || align=left | Disc.: SDSS || 
|- id="2001 YL163" bgcolor=#E9E9E9
| 0 ||  || MBA-M || 17.64 || 1.7 km || multiple || 2001–2021 || 08 Apr 2021 || 72 || align=left | Disc.: Spacewatch || 
|- id="2001 YM163" bgcolor=#fefefe
| 0 ||  || HUN || 18.1 || data-sort-value="0.71" | 710 m || multiple || 2001–2020 || 06 Dec 2020 || 98 || align=left | Disc.: SDSS || 
|- id="2001 YN163" bgcolor=#d6d6d6
| 0 ||  || MBA-O || 16.9 || 2.3 km || multiple || 2001–2019 || 08 Feb 2019 || 62 || align=left | Disc.: Spacewatch || 
|- id="2001 YP163" bgcolor=#d6d6d6
| 0 ||  || MBA-O || 16.3 || 3.1 km || multiple || 2001–2021 || 13 Jun 2021 || 105 || align=left | Disc.: SDSS || 
|- id="2001 YR163" bgcolor=#d6d6d6
| 0 ||  || MBA-O || 16.6 || 2.7 km || multiple || 2001–2020 || 16 May 2020 || 62 || align=left | Disc.: Spacewatch || 
|- id="2001 YT163" bgcolor=#fefefe
| 0 ||  || MBA-I || 18.1 || data-sort-value="0.71" | 710 m || multiple || 2001–2020 || 23 Mar 2020 || 55 || align=left | Disc.: SDSS || 
|- id="2001 YU163" bgcolor=#fefefe
| 1 ||  || HUN || 18.9 || data-sort-value="0.49" | 490 m || multiple || 2001–2019 || 02 Sep 2019 || 78 || align=left | Disc.: SDSS || 
|- id="2001 YV163" bgcolor=#fefefe
| 0 ||  || MBA-I || 17.6 || data-sort-value="0.90" | 900 m || multiple || 2001–2021 || 12 Jan 2021 || 155 || align=left | Disc.: SDSS || 
|- id="2001 YW163" bgcolor=#fefefe
| 0 ||  || MBA-I || 18.21 || data-sort-value="0.68" | 680 m || multiple || 2001–2021 || 15 Apr 2021 || 77 || align=left | Disc.: SDSS || 
|- id="2001 YX163" bgcolor=#d6d6d6
| 0 ||  || MBA-O || 17.1 || 2.1 km || multiple || 2001–2020 || 16 Mar 2020 || 49 || align=left | Disc.: Spacewatch || 
|- id="2001 YY163" bgcolor=#fefefe
| 0 ||  || MBA-I || 17.8 || data-sort-value="0.82" | 820 m || multiple || 2000–2019 || 22 Oct 2019 || 94 || align=left | Disc.: SDSS || 
|- id="2001 YZ163" bgcolor=#fefefe
| 0 ||  || MBA-I || 18.5 || data-sort-value="0.59" | 590 m || multiple || 2001–2020 || 15 Feb 2020 || 74 || align=left | Disc.: Spacewatch || 
|- id="2001 YA164" bgcolor=#d6d6d6
| 0 ||  || MBA-O || 17.19 || 2.0 km || multiple || 2001–2021 || 13 Sep 2021 || 46 || align=left | Disc.: Spacewatch || 
|- id="2001 YB164" bgcolor=#E9E9E9
| 0 ||  || MBA-M || 17.17 || 2.0 km || multiple || 2001–2021 || 17 Apr 2021 || 75 || align=left | Disc.: Spacewatch || 
|- id="2001 YC164" bgcolor=#fefefe
| 0 ||  || MBA-I || 18.3 || data-sort-value="0.65" | 650 m || multiple || 1994–2020 || 22 Mar 2020 || 86 || align=left | Disc.: Spacewatch || 
|- id="2001 YD164" bgcolor=#E9E9E9
| 0 ||  || MBA-M || 17.99 || data-sort-value="0.75" | 750 m || multiple || 2001–2022 || 23 Jan 2022 || 84 || align=left | Disc.: SDSS || 
|- id="2001 YE164" bgcolor=#d6d6d6
| 0 ||  || MBA-O || 16.8 || 2.4 km || multiple || 2001–2019 || 28 Jan 2019 || 39 || align=left | Disc.: SDSS || 
|- id="2001 YF164" bgcolor=#d6d6d6
| 0 ||  || MBA-O || 17.36 || 1.9 km || multiple || 2001–2021 || 10 Aug 2021 || 46 || align=left | Disc.: SDSS || 
|- id="2001 YG164" bgcolor=#d6d6d6
| 0 ||  || MBA-O || 16.5 || 2.8 km || multiple || 2001–2020 || 27 Feb 2020 || 55 || align=left | Disc.: LPL/Spacewatch II || 
|- id="2001 YH164" bgcolor=#d6d6d6
| 0 ||  || MBA-O || 17.1 || 2.1 km || multiple || 2001–2020 || 25 May 2020 || 45 || align=left | Disc.: Spacewatch || 
|- id="2001 YJ164" bgcolor=#fefefe
| 1 ||  || MBA-I || 18.3 || data-sort-value="0.65" | 650 m || multiple || 2001–2020 || 24 Dec 2020 || 38 || align=left | Disc.: Spacewatch || 
|- id="2001 YK164" bgcolor=#d6d6d6
| 0 ||  || MBA-O || 17.5 || 1.8 km || multiple || 2001–2019 || 16 Jan 2019 || 26 || align=left | Disc.: SDSS || 
|- id="2001 YL164" bgcolor=#FA8072
| 0 ||  || MCA || 19.6 || data-sort-value="0.36" | 360 m || multiple || 2001–2017 || 23 Oct 2017 || 23 || align=left | Disc.: SDSS || 
|- id="2001 YM164" bgcolor=#fefefe
| 0 ||  || HUN || 19.40 || data-sort-value="0.39" | 390 m || multiple || 2001–2021 || 10 May 2021 || 29 || align=left | Disc.: SDSS || 
|- id="2001 YO164" bgcolor=#d6d6d6
| 0 ||  || MBA-O || 16.33 || 3.0 km || multiple || 2001–2021 || 09 Sep 2021 || 93 || align=left | Disc.: Spacewatch || 
|- id="2001 YP164" bgcolor=#d6d6d6
| 0 ||  || MBA-O || 16.1 || 3.4 km || multiple || 2001–2020 || 23 Jun 2020 || 115 || align=left | Disc.: SDSS || 
|- id="2001 YQ164" bgcolor=#d6d6d6
| 0 ||  || MBA-O || 16.55 || 2.7 km || multiple || 2001–2021 || 12 Aug 2021 || 103 || align=left | Disc.: SDSS || 
|- id="2001 YR164" bgcolor=#E9E9E9
| 0 ||  || MBA-M || 17.4 || 1.4 km || multiple || 2001–2020 || 16 Mar 2020 || 87 || align=left | Disc.: SDSS || 
|- id="2001 YS164" bgcolor=#fefefe
| 0 ||  || MBA-I || 17.4 || data-sort-value="0.98" | 980 m || multiple || 2001–2021 || 15 Jan 2021 || 69 || align=left | Disc.: SDSS || 
|- id="2001 YT164" bgcolor=#E9E9E9
| 0 ||  || MBA-M || 17.51 || data-sort-value="0.94" | 940 m || multiple || 2001–2021 || 09 Sep 2021 || 66 || align=left | Disc.: Spacewatch || 
|- id="2001 YU164" bgcolor=#fefefe
| 0 ||  || MBA-I || 17.87 || data-sort-value="0.79" | 790 m || multiple || 1998–2021 || 06 Apr 2021 || 71 || align=left | Disc.: SDSS || 
|- id="2001 YV164" bgcolor=#d6d6d6
| 0 ||  || MBA-O || 16.49 || 2.8 km || multiple || 2001–2021 || 25 Nov 2021 || 108 || align=left | Disc.: SDSS || 
|- id="2001 YW164" bgcolor=#E9E9E9
| 0 ||  || MBA-M || 17.49 || 1.3 km || multiple || 2001–2021 || 07 Sep 2021 || 72 || align=left | Disc.: Spacewatch || 
|- id="2001 YY164" bgcolor=#d6d6d6
| 0 ||  || MBA-O || 16.4 || 2.9 km || multiple || 2001–2020 || 27 Apr 2020 || 63 || align=left | Disc.: SDSS || 
|- id="2001 YZ164" bgcolor=#E9E9E9
| 0 ||  || MBA-M || 17.20 || 1.5 km || multiple || 2001–2021 || 30 Jun 2021 || 60 || align=left | Disc.: LPL/Spacewatch II || 
|- id="2001 YA165" bgcolor=#d6d6d6
| 0 ||  || MBA-O || 16.7 || 2.5 km || multiple || 2001–2019 || 08 Jan 2019 || 48 || align=left | Disc.: SDSS || 
|- id="2001 YB165" bgcolor=#E9E9E9
| 0 ||  || MBA-M || 18.12 || data-sort-value="0.71" | 710 m || multiple || 2001–2021 || 25 Nov 2021 || 69 || align=left | Disc.: SDSS || 
|- id="2001 YC165" bgcolor=#d6d6d6
| 0 ||  || MBA-O || 16.59 || 2.7 km || multiple || 2001–2021 || 05 Jul 2021 || 52 || align=left | Disc.: NEAT || 
|- id="2001 YE165" bgcolor=#d6d6d6
| 1 ||  || MBA-O || 16.4 || 2.9 km || multiple || 2001–2020 || 27 Feb 2020 || 52 || align=left | Disc.: Spacewatch || 
|- id="2001 YF165" bgcolor=#fefefe
| 1 ||  || MBA-I || 18.3 || data-sort-value="0.65" | 650 m || multiple || 2001–2019 || 24 Dec 2019 || 42 || align=left | Disc.: Spacewatch || 
|- id="2001 YG165" bgcolor=#E9E9E9
| 0 ||  || MBA-M || 17.9 || 1.1 km || multiple || 2001–2020 || 19 Apr 2020 || 36 || align=left | Disc.: SDSS || 
|- id="2001 YH165" bgcolor=#d6d6d6
| 0 ||  || MBA-O || 17.1 || 2.1 km || multiple || 2001–2019 || 24 Sep 2019 || 29 || align=left | Disc.: Kitt Peak Obs. || 
|- id="2001 YJ165" bgcolor=#d6d6d6
| 0 ||  || MBA-O || 15.50 || 4.4 km || multiple || 2001–2021 || 12 Apr 2021 || 85 || align=left | Disc.: SDSSAlt.: 2010 DZ64 || 
|- id="2001 YK165" bgcolor=#fefefe
| 0 ||  || MBA-I || 17.3 || 1.0 km || multiple || 2001–2021 || 06 Jan 2021 || 59 || align=left | Disc.: SDSS || 
|- id="2001 YL165" bgcolor=#d6d6d6
| 0 ||  || MBA-O || 16.7 || 2.5 km || multiple || 1997–2020 || 11 May 2020 || 70 || align=left | Disc.: SDSS || 
|- id="2001 YM165" bgcolor=#d6d6d6
| 0 ||  || MBA-O || 17.6 || 1.7 km || multiple || 2001–2017 || 10 Dec 2017 || 24 || align=left | Disc.: SDSS || 
|- id="2001 YN165" bgcolor=#E9E9E9
| 0 ||  || MBA-M || 16.76 || 2.5 km || multiple || 2001–2021 || 03 May 2021 || 61 || align=left | Disc.: Spacewatch || 
|- id="2001 YO165" bgcolor=#E9E9E9
| 0 ||  || MBA-M || 17.82 || 1.5 km || multiple || 1993–2021 || 08 May 2021 || 56 || align=left | Disc.: SDSS || 
|- id="2001 YP165" bgcolor=#fefefe
| 0 ||  || MBA-I || 18.2 || data-sort-value="0.68" | 680 m || multiple || 2001–2020 || 21 Mar 2020 || 43 || align=left | Disc.: NEAT || 
|- id="2001 YS165" bgcolor=#C2FFFF
| 0 ||  || JT || 14.0 || 8.8 km || multiple || 2001–2020 || 24 Jun 2020 || 81 || align=left | Disc.: SpacewatchTrojan camp (L5) || 
|- id="2001 YT165" bgcolor=#fefefe
| 0 ||  || MBA-I || 17.7 || data-sort-value="0.86" | 860 m || multiple || 2001–2021 || 10 Jan 2021 || 61 || align=left | Disc.: Spacewatch || 
|- id="2001 YU165" bgcolor=#E9E9E9
| 0 ||  || MBA-M || 16.6 || 2.7 km || multiple || 2001–2020 || 02 Feb 2020 || 50 || align=left | Disc.: NEAT || 
|- id="2001 YV165" bgcolor=#d6d6d6
| 0 ||  || MBA-O || 16.97 || 2.2 km || multiple || 2001–2021 || 30 Jul 2021 || 66 || align=left | Disc.: LPL/Spacewatch IIAdded on 21 August 2021 || 
|}
back to top

References 
 

Lists of unnumbered minor planets